Pygmalion, ou La Statue de Chypre ( Pygmalion, or The Cyprus Statue) is a  ballet in 4 Acts-6 Scenes, with choreography by Marius Petipa and music by Prince Nikita Trubestkoi.

Ballets by Marius Petipa
1883 ballet premieres
Works based on Pygmalion from Ovid's Metamorphoses
Ballets premiered at the Bolshoi Theatre, Saint Petersburg